Juan Felipe Villa Ruiz (born 10 October 1999) is a Colombian professional footballer who plays as a midfielder for Greek Super League 2 club Apollon Larissa.

Career
Villa made his professional debut with Gil Vicente in a 0-0 Primeira Liga tie with Boavista on 22 September 2019. On 9 January 2020, Villa joined Fafe on loan for the rest of the season.

References

External links
 
 ZeroZero Profile

1999 births
Living people
People from Antioquia
Colombian footballers
Association football midfielders
Gil Vicente F.C. players
AD Fafe players
Primeira Liga players
Campeonato de Portugal (league) players
Colombian expatriate footballers
Expatriate footballers in Portugal
Colombian expatriate sportspeople in Portugal